The Stubbs Society for Foreign Affairs and Defence, commonly referred to simply as Stubbs Society, is the University of Oxford's oldest officially affiliated paper-reading and debating society (not to be confused with the unaffiliated debating society the Oxford Union). It is the university's forum for scholarship in international history, grand strategy and foreign affairs.

Named in honour of the Victorian historian, William Stubbs, in 1884, the Society has throughout its history welcomed many prominent speakers across the humanities and sciences. Its alumni includes former Home Secretaries, Lord High Chancellors, Archbishops of Canterbury, world leaders, Nobel laureate recipients, Victoria Cross holders, journalists and academics. Notable past-office holders include political theorist Sir Isaiah Berlin, socialist and second-wave feminist Sheila Rowbotham, military historian Sir Charles Oman, Canadian Prime Minister Lester B. Pearson, Archbishop of Canterbury Lord Lang and Winston Churchill's Home Secretary the Earl of Kilmuir.

Membership
Life membership of the society is available to anyone studying at the following institutions:
University of Oxford
Oxford Brookes University
Oxford Centre for Islamic Studies
Oxford Centre for Hebrew and Jewish Studies  
Staff members of the University of Oxford or any of its colleges or permanent private halls. 

Shorter one-year memberships are also available to those participating in visiting study programmes at Oxford. 

Discounted membership is given to those currently or formerly serving in His Majesty's Armed Forces. This includes the University Officers' Training Corps, the University Royal Naval Unit, and the University Air Squadron, for whom a significant proportion of members are associated with.

History

Foundation

When an American, Samuel A. Brearley Jr., introduced the idea of the 'seminar' to Oxford in 1882, his initiative became, first, the Oxford Historical Seminar, and then, in 1884, the Stubbs Society. Functioning as a 'proving ground for future leaders and the founders of new fields of enquiry', the Society fostered critical thinking and intellectual curiosity under the aegis of dons such as Sir Charles Oman, E. A. Freeman, and with members including such future doyens of the historical profession as James Tait, Sir Charles Harding, and Frederick York Powell.

The photo to the right shows the original members of the society in which there are at least four future Members of Parliament, an Archbishop of Canterbury and some of the greatest scholars of the historical profession.

The Society's 'Transactions', largely extant from 1894 in the Bodleian Library, reveal much about its early character; but the Society resists easy characterisation. The early model has overtones of the gentleman's club, with one blackball in six enough to prevent election as a member and the Society colours being "claret, cider and coffee – the only drinks that were permitted at its meetings." The original constitution, too, declared the Society would "honour its toast to Clio in mulled claret.".

Equally, if some of the talks and debates are replete with naivety and sui generis moral judgement, discussion has often been insightful, sophisticated, and culturally inflected: for instance, a paper on Lollardy, delivered in the 1910s, provoked suggestions that Lollardy was a rhetorically-constructed vehicle for the condemnation of the enemies of the Lancastrian regime—a thesis broadly similar to that advanced by recent historians of the Lollards such as Paul Strohm. The Stubbs Society, then, seems to have always been a vigorous intellectual space, necessarily coloured by its setting, but nonetheless (indeed, in some respects, all the more) worthy of attention.

The Society has maintained throughout its existence a lively programme of social events. Indeed records of the Society's 1903 triennial dinner talk of a 7-course meal served to members. Today, the Society continues to provide opportunities for members to engage with like-minded practitioners and students with an annual garden party and dinner.

Female membership
The Society, whilst rooted in its rich heritage, has always been open to new ideas and it is the vibrancy of its membership and events which keeps the Society alive today. It was Lord Beloff, the Conservative peer and university administrator, who first proposed the admission of women in 1939, some 30 years ahead of the Oxford Union. Female students from Somerville, Lady Margaret Hall and other new women's colleges joined eagerly, leading to the presidency of Ann Faber in 1942.

One of the first female members of the Society was a young Agnes Headlam-Morley who rose later to become Montague Burton Professor of International Relations - the first woman to be appointed to a chair at Oxford. Professor Headlam-Morley spoke on "British Foreign Policy During the Last Century and that of Mr Chamberlain's".

Past speakers
Historically, individuals were invited to address members of the Stubbs Society just once in their career. It was thus well-known in the world of academia and in the corridors of Westminster as one of the most prestigious invitations anyone could receive - to turn down an invitation to speak was rare. In over a century of continual activity, the Society has been addressed by a series of eminent speakers in meetings famous, sometimes notorious, for the combative discussion that ensues after a paper has been read. Indeed, Conrad Russell recalled an occasion when Geoffrey Elton was the speaker:

The first time I met Geoffrey Elton was when I was a postgraduate in 1960. After addressing the Stubbs Society in Oxford, he faced a concerted assault, begun "while Lawrence is getting his anti-tank gun into position". I rashly wandered into the cross-fire and defended him.

The speaker lineups have been appropriately diverse, ranging from Joseph Needham on the history of Chinese science, to Christopher Andrew on MI5, to Lord Sumption on the Royal Navy during the Hundred Years' War. In one instance, the author Fernández-Armesto described how "Fatally pertinent questions reduced the excellent but academically underqualified historical writer Veronica Wedgwood to tears." He continued:

I recall an occasion when a visiting professor from Lancaster, who gave a talk on an early-18th-century Tory, wilted on being asked, "What have you added to what Macaulay has to say on the subject?" Self-destructively, he burbled, "I didn't know anyone still read Macaulay." "We do in this university," rejoined his interrogator.

Other events have been contentious in their own right. On one occasion, the controversial British politician Enoch Powell was invited to address the Society on the topic of constitutional history.

In recent years, speakers have included:

Sir Malcolm Rifkind - Former Defence Secretary and Foreign Secretary
Sir Mark Sedwill - Former Cabinet Secretary and Head of the Home Civil Service 
Sir Geoffrey Nice - Lead prosecutor at President Slobodan Milošević's trial for war crimes
Sir John Sawers - Former Chief of the Secret Intelligence Service (MI6)
Sir Julian King - The last British European Commissioner
Kate Adie - Former Chief News Correspondent for BBC News 
Lord Patten - The 28th and last Governor of Hong Kong
Lord Houghton - Former Chief of the Defence Staff
Lord Alderdice - First Speaker of the Northern Ireland Assembly (1998–2004)
Ben Ferencz - Last living Nuremberg trials prosecutor
Ciaran Martin - First CEO of the National Cyber Security Centre (United Kingdom)
James Arroyo - Director at the Ditchley Foundation

Governance

Elections
Much rivalry exists for the Presidency of the "chief historical discussion club", particularly between the central colleges of the University: specifically between members from New College, Christ Church, Magdalen College and St John's College. Indeed, Paul Johnson, writing in the Spectator, recalled an episode involving Lord Dacre:

That term, in 1948, I was due to be elected secretary at the final meeting. As treasurer, I had noted that a suspicious number of extra subscriptions had been taken out in the previous fortnight but, not being a conspiracy theorist, had thought no more of it. However, when I and Karl Leyser arrived for the meeting, we found it packed with strangers, chiefly red-faced Christ Church louts, who looked as though they would have been more at home at a bump-supper or a Bullingdon Club grind. Roper, who was now Censor of Christ Church, had hustled them all together to vote us out of office, as indeed they did.

It was the kind of plot the CP had perfected in the British trades-union movement, and Roper had clearly studied the party's methods. His delight at the success of his scheme was so transparent and schoolboyish that I had to laugh. though the rest of the Monks [colloquial term for students at Magdalen College] were very annoyed.

Trevor-Roper later became Senior Member of the Society, but others of such diverse political persuasions as Christopher Hill have also fulfilled this role over the years.

Through much of its history, the Stubbs Society was highly selective, with membership conditional on the support of tutors. It was designed to be "an elite from which future historians are supposed to be drawn". Indeed membership was so restrictive that future greats such as A J P Taylor were not invited to join whilst studying at Oxford. Such strict regulation ensured "meetings brought dons and undergraduates together in companionable complicity".

Modern composition
Today, the Society looks very different to what it once did with an open-membership to students of all disciplines. However, there continues to be just as much competition for the Presidency with internal committee elections held at the end of every term.

Alongside the prestigious position of President there are three senior offices: Vice-President, Treasurer, and Secretary. In order to stand for President, candidates are expected to have held one of these three offices.

Past  officers
A list of past officers of the Stubbs Society includes:

Academia

Sheila Rowbotham - Prominent second-wave feminist and socialist
Sir Isaiah Berlin - Political theorist 
Sir John Hicks - Nobel Prize-winning economist 
Sir Charles Oman - Military historian and politician 
Sir William Ashley - Economic historian 
Sir Charles Firth - English Civil War historian and Regius Professor of Modern History 
Sir Frederick Powicke- Medieval historian and Regius Professor of History  
Sir Fred Clarke - Director of the Institute of Education, 
Sir John Edward Lloyd - Welsh historian 
Sir James Holt - Magna Carta scholar and Fitzwilliam College, Cambridge Master, 
Lord Dacre - Modern historian and Regius Professor of Modern History 
Dame Gillian Beer - Literary critic and first female President of the Society 
Catherine Hughes - Diplomat and former Principal of Somerville College 
George Norman Clark - Chichele Professor of Economic History and Provost of Oriel College, 
James Tait - Medieval Historian 
Manning Clark - Australia's most famous historian 
Felipe Fernández-Armesto - Historian 
Roger Howell Jr. - Former President of Bowdoin College, 
John Henry Whitehead - President of the London Mathematical Society 
John Farquhar Fulton - Neurophysiologist 
Gareth Stedman Jones - Marxist historian 
Lawrence Stone - English Civil War historian 
Karl Leyser - Medieval historian 
Keith Robbins - Former Vice-chancellor of the University of Wales 
Alan Deyermond - Hispanist 
Kenneth McFarlane - Medieval historian 
Samuel  A Brearley Jr - Pioneer of women's education and founder of the Brearley School,

Politics and government

Lester B. Pearson - Former Canadian Prime Minister and Nobel laureate 
Earl of Kilmuir - Former Home Secretary, Lord High Chancellor and Nuremberg prosecutor
Walt Whitman Rostow - Former US National Security Advisor 
Lt Gen Sir Adrian Carton de Wiart - Victoria Cross holder 
Sir John Marriott - Educationist and Conservative Member of parliament 
Sir Ryland Adkins - Senior British Judge and Liberal politician 
Sir Michael Wheeler-Booth - Clerk of the Parliaments 
Sir Robert Birley - Anti-apartheid campaigner and headmaster of Charterhouse and Eton College 
Lord Beloff - Conservative life peer and prominent Eurosceptic
Lord Monk Bretton - Peer of the Realm
Earl Russell - Historian and Liberal Democrat peer 
Thomas Ellis - Leader of the Welsh home-rule campaign Cymru Fydd 
Simon Manley - British Diplomat
Charles Lonsdale - British Diplomat

Religion

Lord Lang - Former Archbishop of Canterbury 
Hensley Henson - Former Bishop of Durham 
William Holden Hutton - Former Dean of Winchester 
Dr Alexander Carlyle - Former Canon Treasurer of Truro Cathedral
Philip Caraman - Jesuit priest and author

Broadcasting and journalism

Paul Johnson - Writer and recipient of the Presidential Medal of Freedom
Manicasothy Saravanamuttu - Sri Lankan journalist and diplomat
Michael Davie - Journalist and biographer 
Matthew d'Ancona - Journalist and Editor
Guy Browning - Journalist and after-dinner speaker

Past Presidents

Key

Presidents 1907-1919

Presidents 1983-1993

Presidents 2018-2023

In popular culture
In the Village Tales series by GMW Wemyss, the Duchess of Taunton is described as a former member of the Stubbs Society.

See also
Oxford Union Society
Cambridge Union
Yale Political Union - with whom the Stubbs Society has a historic relationship.
Harvard College Debating Union
Berkeley Forum

References

thumb

Historical societies of the United Kingdom
Clubs and societies of the University of Oxford